Obscurior lateraprocessa is a moth of the family Erebidae first described by Michael Fibiger in 2010. It is known from North Sumatra in Indonesia.

The wingspan is about 12 mm. The head, patagia, anterior part of the tegulae, prothorax, basal part of the costa, costal part of the medial area and fringes are black. The costal medial area is quadrangular. The forewing ground colour is light brown, suffused with brown patches and few black scales. All crosslines are indistinct. The terminal line is well marked by dark-brown interneural dots. The hindwing is grey, without a discal spot. The underside of the forewing is brown, while the underside of the hindwing is light grey, with a discal spot.

References

Micronoctuini
Taxa named by Michael Fibiger
Moths described in 2010